Lecco railway station is the main station serving the town and comune of Lecco, in the region of Lombardy, northern Italy. Opened in 1863, it is the terminus of five lines, namely to Bergamo, to Como, to Milan, to Molteno and Monza and to Tirano.

The station is currently managed by Rete Ferroviaria Italiana (RFI).  However, the commercial area of the passenger building is managed by Centostazioni.  Each of these companies is a subsidiary of Ferrovie dello Stato (FS), Italy's state-owned rail company.

Train services are operated by regional railway company Trenord.

Location
Lecco railway station is situated in Piazza Lega Lombarda, at the northeastern edge of the town centre.

History
The station was opened on 4 November 1863, upon the inauguration of the Lecco–Calolziocorte section of the Lecco–Bergamo railway.

Features

The passenger building is made up of three sections.  The main one (where there are guest services for travellers and the local station master) is on two floors, while the other two sections are single storey.

Next to the passenger building is a small one-storey structure that houses the public conveniences.

The station yard is composed of five through tracks, with platforms connected by two pedestrian underpasses.  There is also a dock platform that can accommodate trains from the south, and a track leading to the goods yard.

In the goods yard, there is a goods shed. The tracks in the goods yard have been dismantled, and the goods shed converted to storage. The architecture of the goods shed is very similar to that of other Italian railway stations.

All buildings at the station are rectangular in layout.

In 2009, work was completed on a facelift of the station co-financed by Centostazioni and RFI.  The renovations altered the configuration of the spaces within the passenger building, by creating a new central area (lobby) and side aisles.  The renovation work also involved the installation of a new lighting system and other new technology equipment, the removal of architectural barriers such as the elimination of steps and the extension of the ramps, the upgrading of public conveniences and the renovation of the exterior facade of the building with new plaster and a new lighting system that enhances its appearance at night.

In the course of the renovation work, a new secondary entrance was created from Via Balicco, the road parallel to the tracks.  The intent of that alteration was to improve public access to the station, especially for travellers who reside in the upper part of the city.

Passenger and train movements
Lecco railway station has about seven million passenger movements each year.

The station is served by regional and suburban trains.  The main destinations of the regional trains are Como, Bergamo, Milano Centrale and Sondrio.  The station is a terminus of line S8 of the Milan suburban railway service (Milano Porta Garibaldi–Monza–Carnate–Lecco; hourly) and of the new line S7 (Milano Porta Garibaldi–Monza–Molteno–Lecco).

A total of about 154 trains call at the station daily, and their main destinations are Monza, Sondrio, Tirano and Milan.

Interchange
In front of the passenger building is a taxi stand, and a stop for suburban buses, which link the station with the rest of the province via a bus station in Valsassina.

See also

History of rail transport in Italy
List of railway stations in Lombardy
Rail transport in Italy
Railway stations in Italy

References

External links

Railway Station
Railway stations in Lombardy
Railway stations opened in 1863
Milan S Lines stations
1863 establishments in Italy
Railway stations in Italy opened in the 19th century